The Populist Party was a political party in Turkey which was active between 1983 and 1985.

Background 

After the coup of 1980, all political parties were dissolved by the military government (ruling through the National Security Council or ) regardless of their political views, on 16 October 1981. In 1983, the MGK decided to allow the formation of new parties with severe restrictions. The new parties were not allowed to use the names of former parties and former politicians were not allowed to be charter member of the new parties.

Formation

One of the parties banned by MGK was the Republican People's Party, the oldest party in Turkey. Supporters of the CHP including Avni Güler, Engin Aydın and Turhan Timuçin founded the People's Party as an intended successor to the CHP on 19 May 1983. The chairman of the party was Necdet Calp, who had once been an executive assistant of late İsmet İnönü, the second president of Turkey. Although he was not a widely known name,  he caused nationwide excitement in a panel discussion on TV due to his reaction to the proposal of privatization of the İstanbul Bosphorus Bridge.

Elections 

The MGK banned SODEP, the main rival of the HP for the mantle of the CHP: as the sole heir of the CHP, the HP received 30.5 percent of the vote in the general election of 6 November 1983. The HP became the main opposition party. However this support could not be maintained in the local elections on 21 March 1984 as SODEP was now permitted to stand and the majority of the former CHP votes were redirected to SODEP. The HP had to be content with a 8.8 percent, which meant a loss of nearly 75 percent of its vote in less than five months.

Merging with SODEP 

At the party's congress on 27 June 1985, Necdet Calp lost his position as chair to Aydın Güven Gürkan. Gürkan met with Rahşan Ecevit, who was planning to found the DSP party, and Erdal İnönü, the chairman of SODEP, for a possible merger. Although Ecevit was reluctant, İnönü, who had already proposed a merger of all CHP supporters, was an enthusiastic supporter of merging the two parties. On 3 November 1985, SODEP merged with the HP. İnönü agreed to give up his seat during the merger period. The new party formed by this fusion was named the Social Democrat Populist Party with the abbreviation SHP, which resembled that of CHP and a party flag with 6 arrows which resembled that of the CHP. The abbreviation SHP should not be confused with the same abbreviation used by the similarly-named but distinct Social Democratic People's Party after 2002.

See also 
:Category:Populist Party (Turkey) politicians
CHP
SODEP
List of political parties in Turkey
Aydın Güven Gürkan (1941–2006)

References 

 
Defunct social democratic parties in Turkey
Political parties established in 1983
1983 establishments in Turkey
1985 disestablishments in Turkey
Political parties disestablished in 1985
Secularism in Turkey